Nitroethylene (also known as nitroethene) is a liquid organic compound with the formula C2H3NO2. It is the simplest nitroalkene, which are unsaturated carbon chains with at least one double bond and a NO2 functional group. Nitroethylene serves as a useful intermediate in the production of various other chemicals.

Properties
Nitroethylene has a dipole moment from the electron withdrawing nitro group present in the molecule, even though it is a neutral species. As a result, it is soluble in water and non-polar solvents. Nitroethylene is extremely reactive, even at low temperatures. It readily decomposes at room temperature. In sharp contrast to reports that highlight its instability, however, it has been found to be stable as a standard solution in benzene for at least 6 months when stored in a refrigerator (-10 °C).

Production
Nitroethene can be produced by reacting nitromethane with formaldehyde or paraformaldehyde (a polymeric form) to form 2-nitroethanol, which can then undergo an E2 acid-catalyzed dehydration reaction. Alternatively, nitroethene may be produced via thermal dehydratation of 2-nitroethanol in the presence of phthalic anhydride.

Reactions
Nitroethylene is a very electron deficient molecule. As a result, nitroethylene usually acts as the electrophile in reactions. Nitroethylene is capable of reacting spontaneously at temperatures as low as -100 °C, often as endothermic reactions. Common reactions for this molecule are cycloadditions, radical additions, and nucleophilic additions.

Cycloaddition
Nitroethylene can act at the 2π electron source in a [4+2] cycloaddition. The nitro group in the molecule serves as an electron withdrawing group that makes the molecule a good candidate as a dienophile. It readily forms an adduct with cyclopentadiene, spiroheptadiene, and their derivatives in a [4+2] cycloaddition.

Nitroethene can react at the 2π electron source in a [3+2] cycloaddition with nitrones.

Nitroethylene is also reactive in domino-cycloaddition processes. For example, they can initially react with a chiral vinyl ether, and then react in a [3+2] cycloaddition with an electron deficient alkene such as dimethyl fumarate. The reactions are almost spontaneous at -78 °C.

Radical polymerization
At very low temperatures (i.e. -78 °C), nitroethylene can polymerize with itself through initiation by one of its lone pairs. This process can be moderated by using t-butyl solvent. Research has been conducted on performing batch polymerization at room temperature in THF solvent. This process requires gamma ray irradiation for initiation. Termination of the polymerization requires a radical retardant, such as hydrogen bromide or hydrogen chloride. Water must be carefully removed prior to the polymerization, as nitroethylene is sensitive to polymerization by traces of water.

Addition and Reduction
In addition to standard nucleophilic addition reactions on the C=C bond, nitroethylene can serve as a Michael acceptor in a Michael addition reaction. A typical Michael donor (i.e. ketone or aldehyde) can be used. Like most nitro compounds, a platinum/palladium catalyzed reaction with hydrogen gas can reduce the nitro group to an amine group.

Another example is the Michael reaction of indole and nitroethylene.

Uses
The main use of nitroethylene is as an intermediate reagent in chemical synthesis. One example is the production of N-(2-nitroethyl)-aniline with aniline at room temperature. The reaction utilizes benzene as a solvent and proceeds to about 90% yield in 12 hours.

Another example of nitroethylene is from the coupling reaction with a vinyl Grignard reagent and a silyl glyoxalate to form a nitrocylopentanol. This process via a Henry reaction and is highly diastereoselective.

References

Nitro compounds
Alkene derivatives
Vinyl compounds